Charles Sinclair Butt (28 July 190021 January 1973) was an Australian businessman. He worked for the Rapson Tyre company and the Dunlop Rubber Company. By 1934 he was Dunlop's chief accountant. He also served as general manager and Controller of Tyres for the Olympic Tyre & Rubber Co. Limited.

In 1962, he was made a Companion of the Order of St Michael and St George.

References

External links
 Butt, Charles Sinclair (1900–1973), in the Australian Dictionary of Biography

1900 births
1973 deaths
20th-century Australian businesspeople